, also known as Tōjū Zenchū , Tōshū Zenchū 鄧州全忠, and as Nantenbō Tōjū, was a Japanese Zen Master.  In his time known as a fiery reformer, he was also a prolific and accomplished artist.  He produced many fine examples of Zen Art and helped bridge the gap between older forms of Zen Buddhist art and its continuation in the 20th century.

See also 
Buddhist art in Japan
Bokuseki

References 
 Mohr, Michel. 1996. Monastic Tradition and Lay Practice from the Perspective of Nantenbō: A Response of Japanese Zen Buddhism to Modernity. Zen Buddhism Today 12, 63–89.
 Mohr, Michel. 1998. Japanese Zen Schools and the Transition to Meiji: A Plurality of Responses in the Nineteenth Century. Japanese Journal of Religious Studies: Special Issue on Meiji Zen 25, no. 1–2: 167–213.

External links 
 Nakahara Nantenbō, by Matthew Welch in The Art of Twentieth-Century Zen, Paintings and Calligraphy by Japanese Masters Eds. Audrey Yoshiko Seo with Stephen Addiss. (c) 1988
 中原南天棒, Kotobank (in Japanese)

Japanese calligraphers
Japanese Zen Buddhists
Buddhist artists
1839 births
1925 deaths
19th-century Japanese painters
20th-century Japanese painters